Len Jones is an actor.

Len Jones may also refer to:

Len Jones (footballer)
Len Jones (sailor) in 2008 Vintage Yachting Games – Dragon

See also
Lenny Jones, character in The Bill (series 24)
Leonard Jones (disambiguation)